John Le Mesurier (born John Elton Le Mesurier Halliley; 5 April 1912 – 15 November 1983) was an English actor who performed in many mediums of light entertainment, including film, radio and theatre. Le Mesurier's career spanned from 1934 until his death in 1983.  He is best remembered for his role as Sergeant Arthur Wilson in the BBC situation comedy Dad's Army, between 1968 and 1977.

Le Mesurier made his professional stage debut in September 1934 in Dangerous Corner at the Palladium Theatre in Edinburgh under his birth name, and appeared on television for the first time four years later as Seigneur de Miolans in the BBC Television broadcast of "The Marvellous History of St Bernard".  The broadcast was adapted from a 15th-century manuscript by Henri Ghéon. After wartime service as a captain in the Royal Tank Regiment, Le Mesurier returned to acting and made his radio debut on the BBC Home Service in a March 1947 broadcast of Escape or Die. He continued working in television roles throughout his career, but it was his portrayal in the BBC television play Traitor, of a character loosely based on Kim Philby, which earned him the British Academy Television Award for Best Actor in 1972.

In 1948, Le Mesurier worked on his first film, Death in the Hand, a mystery in which he played the character Jack Mottram. He went on to appear in over 100 films, including Private's Progress (1955), I'm All Right Jack (1959), The Punch and Judy Man (1962), Carlton-Browne of the F.O. (1959), The Pink Panther (1963), Those Magnificent Men in Their Flying Machines (1965), and The Italian Job (1969). He always appeared in supporting roles.

Le Mesurier took a relaxed approach to acting, saying: "I'm a jobbing actor ... as long as they pay me I couldn't care less if my name is billed above or below the title". He was known for playing "an indispensable figure in the gallery of second-rank players which were the glory of the British film industry in its more prolific days". Le Mesurier died in November 1983 from a stomach haemorrhage; his last words before slipping into a coma were: "It's all been rather lovely." The Guardian noted that Le Mesurier gave the impression of an "inimitable brand of bewildered persistence under fire which [he] made his own", while Philip Oakes considered that Le Mesurier single-handedly "made more films watchable, even absorbing than anyone else around".

Selected stage credits

Television

Selected radio broadcasts

Filmography

Discography 
Albums

Singles

Notes and references

Bibliography

External links 
 
 
 
 

Discographies of British artists
Male actor filmographies
British filmographies